Banquells is a surname. Notable people with the surname include:

Rafael Banquells (1917–1990), Cuban-born Mexican actor, director, and television producer
Rocío Banquells (born 1958), Mexican pop singer and actress